Robert John Downey ( Elias Jr.; June 24, 1936 – July 7, 2021) was an American filmmaker and actor. He was known for writing and directing his underground film Putney Swope, a satire on the New York Madison Avenue advertising world. According to film scholar Wheeler Winston Dixon, Downey's films during the 1960s were "strictly take-no-prisoners affairs, with minimal budgets and outrageous satire, effectively pushing forward the countercultural agenda of the day." He was the father of American actor Robert Downey Jr.

Early life
Robert Downey Sr. was born Robert John Elias Jr. in the Manhattan borough of New York City, on June 24, 1936. He was the son of Elizabeth ( McLauchlen), a model, and Robert John Elias Sr., who worked in management of motels and restaurants. His paternal grandparents were Lithuanian Jews, while his mother was of half Hungarian Jewish and half Irish ancestry. He grew up in Rockville Centre, New York. He changed his surname to Downey after his stepfather, when he wanted to enlist in the United States Army while being underage. Downey later said he wrote an unpublished novel during his time in the army, though he spent much of his military career "in the stockade".

Career
Downey initially made his mark creating very low-budget independent films aligning with the Absurdist movement, in line with counterculture, anti-establishment, 1960s America. His work in the late 1960s and 1970s was quintessential anti-establishment, reflecting the nonconformity popularized by larger counterculture movements and given impetus by new freedoms in films, such as the breakdown of codes on censorship. In keeping with the underground tradition, his 1970s films were independently made on shoestring budgets and were relatively obscure in the Absurdist movement, finding cult notoriety.

In 1961, working with film editor Fred von Bernewitz, Downey began writing and directing low-budget 16mm films that gained an underground following, beginning with Ball's Bluff (1961), a fantasy short about a Civil War soldier who awakens in Central Park in 1961. He moved into big-budget filmmaking with the surrealistic Greaser's Palace (1972). His last film was Rittenhouse Square (2005), a documentary capturing life in a Philadelphia park.

Downey's films were often family affairs. His first wife appears in four of his films (Chafed Elbows, Pound, Greaser's Palace, Moment to Moment), as well as co-writing one (Moment to Moment). Daughter Allyson and son Robert Downey Jr. each made their film debuts in the 1970 absurdist comedy Pound at the ages of 7 and 5, respectively; Allyson would appear in one more film by her father, Up the Academy. Robert Jr.'s lengthy acting résumé includes appearances in eight films directed by his father (Pound, Greaser's Palace, Moment to Moment, Up the Academy, America, Rented Lips, Too Much Sun, Hugo Pool), as well as two acting appearances in movies where his father was also an actor (Johnny Be Good, Hail Caesar).

Personal life and death
Downey was married three times. His first marriage was to actress Elsie Ann Ford (1934–2014) in 1962, with whom he had two children: actress-writer Allyson (born 1963) and actor Robert Jr. (born 1965). The marriage ended in divorce in 1975. His second marriage, to actress-writer Laura Ernst, lasted until her death on January 27, 1994, from amyotrophic lateral sclerosis. In 1998 he married his third wife, Rosemary Rogers, humorist and co-author of Saints Preserve Us! and other books. They lived in New York City. Downey died of complications from Parkinson's disease in his sleep at his home in Manhattan, on July 7, 2021, thirteen days after his 85th birthday.

Legacy
The Criterion Collection released five of his films (the National Film Registry inductee Putney Swope, Babo 73, Chafed Elbows, No More Excuses and Taos Tonight) as part of the Eclipse Series.

A 2022 documentary film simply called "Sr." was made by Chris Smith of American Movie fame and was produced by his son. It won the National Board of Review Award for Best Documentary Feature.

Filmography

References

External links
 
  Eclipse Series 33: Up All Night with Robert Downey Sr. on The Criterion Collection

1936 births
2021 deaths
20th-century American male actors
21st-century American male actors
American male film actors
American male television actors
American people of Hungarian-Jewish descent
American people of Irish descent
American people of Lithuanian-Jewish descent
American Ashkenazi Jews
Neurological disease deaths in New York (state)
Deaths from Parkinson's disease
Film directors from New York City
Jewish American male actors
Male actors from New York (state)
Military personnel from New York City
People from Manhattan
People from Rockville Centre, New York
United States Army soldiers
21st-century American Jews